The Honduran records in swimming are the fastest ever performances of swimmers from Honduras, which are recognised and ratified by the Federación Hondureña de Natación.

All records were set in finals unless noted otherwise.

Long Course (50 m)

Men

Women

Mixed relay

Short Course (25 m)

Men

Women

Mixed relay

References

Honduras
Records
Swimming
Swimming